The Bobby Parks Philippine Basketball Association (PBA) Best Import of the Conference award (formerly known as the PBA Best Import of the Conference award) is given to the most outstanding non-Filipino on a team's roster, frequently referred to as the "import." Since imports are restricted to certain conferences, the award is a conference-long award, not a season-long award. The award was renamed on March 31, 2013, after Bobby Parks, a seven-time winner of this award who died a day before due to laryngeal cancer.

Winners

Multiple-time winners

References

Best Import of the Conference
Basketball most valuable player awards
Awards established in 1981
1981 establishments in the Philippines